Václav Bečvář (born 5 July 1957 in Chomutov) is a Czech sport shooter who competed in the 1996 Summer Olympics, in the 2000 Summer Olympics, and in the 2004 Summer Olympics.

References

1957 births
Living people
Czech male sport shooters
ISSF rifle shooters
Olympic shooters of the Czech Republic
Shooters at the 1996 Summer Olympics
Shooters at the 2000 Summer Olympics
Shooters at the 2004 Summer Olympics
Sportspeople from Chomutov